Une vie also known as L'Humble Vérité is the first novel written by Guy de Maupassant. It was serialised in 1883 in the Gil Blas, then published in book form the same year as L'Humble Vérité.

It was the basis for the 1958 film One Life, directed by Alexandre Astruc, an award-winning 2016 film directed by Stéphane Brizé, as well as a 2019 play directed by Arnaud Denis and starring Clémentine Célarié.

Legacy
Leo Tolstoy called Une Vie  "an excellent novel, not only incomparably the best novel by Maupassant, but almost the best French novel since Hugo's Les Misérables."

References

1883 French novels
French novels adapted into films
French novels adapted into plays
French-language novels
Novels first published in serial form
Novels by Guy de Maupassant